The 1998 New Year Honours in New Zealand were appointments by Elizabeth II in her right as Queen of New Zealand, on the advice of the New Zealand government, to various orders and honours to reward and highlight good works by New Zealanders, and to celebrate the passing of 1997 and the beginning of 1998. They were announced on 31 December 1997.

The recipients of honours are displayed here as they were styled before their new honour.

Order of New Zealand (ONZ)
Ordinary member
 James Brendan Bolger  – of Wellington.

New Zealand Order of Merit

Dame Companion (DNZM)
 Fiona Judith Kidman  – of Wellington. For services to literature.

Knight Companion (KNZM)
 Ronald Powell Carter – of Auckland. For services to engineering and business administration.

Companion (CNZM)
 Joan Maureen Bolger – of Wellington. For services to the community.
 Judith Clark – of Wellington. For services to music.
 Charles McNeill Gordon – of Northland. For services to the dairy industry.
 David Templeton Gray – of Auckland. For services to youth and medicine.
 Elizabeth Anne Seaton Jamieson – of Auckland. For services to drug and alcohol education.
 Wallace George Lowe  – of Derby, United Kingdom. For services to New Zealand interests in the United Kingdom.
 Hilary Strang McCormack – of Christchurch. For services to the deaf.
 Jennifer Laughton Millar – of Te Puke. For services to equestrian sport.
 Harold William Orsman – of Wellington. For services to lexicography.
 James Wilmot Rowe – of Wellington. For services to economics and the community.
 Professor Emeritus Frederick Thomas Shannon – of Christchurch. For services to paediatrics.
 Teresa Catherine Turnbull – of Katikati. For services to health administration.
 Beatrice Rae Wilson – of South Canterbury. For services to education and the community.

Officer (ONZM)
 Barbara Margaret Allardyce – of Christchurch. For services to the community.
 Sidney Boyd Ashton – of Christchurch. For services to Māori and the community.
 Richard John Holden Bollard – of Seattle, United States of America. For services to New Zealand interests in the United States of America.
 Patricia Rosalie Christianson  – of Upper Hutt. For services to local-body and community affairs.
 James William Ferguson Foreman – of Auckland. For services to manufacturing.
 Annette Mary Gilbert – of Auckland. For services to the Girl Guide movement and the community.
 Borgia Kurupai Hakaraia – of Ōtaki. For services to the community.
 Paul Stanley Harrop – of Auckland. For services to music and the community.
 Donald Roderick Herdman – of Whakatāne. For services to local-body and community affairs.
 Roy William Hewson – of Petone. For services to education and the community.
 Alison Hylton – of Wanganui. For services to the disabled.
 Joan Margaret Jaggar – of Auckland. For services to the sport of bowls.
 Jocelyn Agnes Jarmey – of Christchurch. For services to the community.
 The Reverend Edward Major Marshall – of Whangaparāoa. For services to education and the community.
 Hazel Irene Nash – of Māpua. For services to youth.
 John Desmond O'Connor – of Westport. For services to the community.
 Swea Lenore Ross Raitt – of Blenheim. For services to the community.
 Topsy Stewart Ratahi – of Wellington. For services to the Māori people and the community.
 Toko Renata Te Taniwha – of Coromandel. For services to the community.
 Patricia Robertson – of Rotorua. For services to the community.
 Robert Donald Spary  – of Arrowtown. For services to aviation and tourism.
 Rodney Douglas Harris Steel – of Christchurch. For services to business and the community.
 Garth Purcell Tapper – of Kaikohe. For service to painting.
 Peter Frederick Wells – of Hamilton. For services to linguistics.
 Alfred Youell – of Coventry, United Kingdom. For services to philanthropy.

Honorary
 Kazumi Nakayama – of Fukuoka, Japan. For services to New Zealand interests in Japan.

Member (MNZM)
 John Stacey Black  – of Taumarunui. For services to the community.
 Ivan Verdun Bowen – of Rotorua. For services to sheep shearing and tourism.
 Patricia Helena Berdina Chitty – of Waiuku. For services to the community.
 Hazel Margaret Christie – of Invercargill. For services to music.
 Constantine (Costa) Cotsilinis – of Athens, Greece. For services to New Zealand interests in Greece.
 David Alexander Dalgleish – of Auckland. For services to rugby and the community.
 The Reverend Canon David Sing Hiong Dang  – of Auckland. For services to the community.
 John Lewis Dobbie – of Hamilton. For services to farming.
 May Eileen Earles – of Auckland. For services to the community.
 Stanley Florence  – of New Plymouth. For services to the dairy industry and the community.
 John Campbell (Jock) Graham – of Auckland. For services to journalism and the wine industry.
 Jacqueline Grant – of Dobson. For services to the community.
 Ian Ernest Greenwood – of Wellington. For services to surf lifesaving and the community.
 Jean Margaret Hill  – of Hastings. For services to health administration and the community.
 John Himiona Hunia  – of Te Teko. For services to the community.
 Nora Patricia Hurley – of New Plymouth. For services to education.
 Cynthia Ruth Landels – of Auckland. For services to Girl Guides.
 Richard George Lawrence – of Te Aroha. For services to the community.
 Jean Elizabeth Lewis – of Timaru. For services to the community.
 Edna Jean Low – of Methven. For services to the community.
 Norman Duncan McKenzie McRae – of Wyndham. For services to the meat industry.
 Laurence (Laurie) William Mains – of Mosgiel. For services to rugby.
 The Honourable Clive Denby Matthewson – of Dunedin. For public services as a Member of Parliament.
 Patricia Jean Park  – of Dunedin. For services to the community.
 Cecily Naomi (Billie) Reading – of Wellington. For services to the community.
 David Dawson Reyburn – of Whangārei. For services to the community.
 Lewis Milner Robinson – of Wanganui. For services to the community.
 Lucy Ruiha Ruri  – of Murupara. For services to the community.
 Douglas Leslie Shaw  – of Auckland. For services to swimming.
 Gillian Kathleen Mary Smith – of Auckland. For services to the disabled.
 Mark James Sorenson – of Lower Hutt. For services to softball and the community.
 Alexandra (Sandy) Stephens – of Nelson. For services to overseas development programmes.
 Peter Arthur Trevor Thomas  – of North Shore City. For services to local-body and community affairs.
 Grenfell Raymore Thurston – of Ruawai. For services to local-body and community affairs.
 Blossom Matiriama Tropman – of Wellington. For services to the community.
 Graeme Walter John Briggs  – Royal New Zealand Naval Volunteer Reserve.
 Mark Ian Ternent – Royal New Zealand Navy.
 Wayne Peter Boustridge – Royal New Zealand Army Logistics Regiment.
 Anne Catherine Campbell – Royal New Zealand Army Medical Corps.
 Brian Walter Ngata – Royal Regiment of New Zealand Artillery.
 David Alexander Ryan – New Zealand Special Air Service.
 Graeme Victor Aldridge – Royal New Zealand Air Force.
 Athol James Forrest – Royal New Zealand Air Force.
 Murray James Heyrick – Royal New Zealand Air Force.
 Steve John Moore – Royal New Zealand Air Force.

Additional
 Simon Oscar Rooke – Royal New Zealand Navy.
 Thomas Michael Allen – Royal New Zealand Navy.

Companion of the Queen's Service Order (QSO)

For community service
 Muriel Gladys Barkman  – of Dunedin.
 The Reverend Richard Newman Buttle  – of Auckland.
 Tanira Gladding Fraser  – of Tokoroa.
 Aldyth Mary Guthrey – of Christchurch.
 Peter Lewis Harris – of Napier.
 Karaka Roberts – of Dunedin.
 Sheila Sykes – of Palmerston North.

For public services
 ruce Macdonald Brown – of Wellington.
 John Ralph Anderson Chaffey  – of North Canterbury.
 Catherine Rosalie Gibson – of Ōtaki.
 Barbara Mary O'Kane  – of Cromwell.
 Isabelle Mary Sherrard – of Auckland.
 Margaret Lilian Swift – of Pukekohe.
 William John Martin Treadwell – of Wanganui.

Queen's Service Medal (QSM)

For community service

 Debbie AnnMarie Anderson – of Lower Hutt.
 Marie Boal – of Leeston.
 Jennifer Box – of Dunedin.
 Nita Clark – of New Plymouth.
 Ethel Maude Collins – of Blenheim.
 Edith Gladys Leslie Coxshall – of Ashburton.
 Hilda Margaret Davidson – of Winton
 Alfred Douglas Dibley – lately of Rotorua.
 Donald Thomas Donaldson  – of Palmerston North.
 Isobel Elsie Fraser Donaldson – of Northland.
 Pat James Gill – of Lower Hutt.
 William Martin Innes – of Dunedin.
 Bryan Eric Jacobsen – of New Plymouth.
 Lorraine Rose Jacobsen – of New Plymouth.
 Arthur Henry (Mick) Jellyman – of Blenheim.
 John Johnston – of Whakatāne.
 Eleanor Jane Leckie – of Dunedin.
 Vicki Janeen Lowrie – of Auckland.
 Mary Imelda Mackle – of Auckland.
 Michael Ronald Mapperson – of Auckland.
 Evelyn Mary Maxwell – of North Shore City.
 Gordon Neil Nuttall – of Christchurch.
 Jessie Joyce O'Brien – of Whakatāne.
 Allan Stanley Parker – of Gisborne.
 Ruth Clara Philburn – of Ngāruawāhia.
 Daphne Emmeline Regan – of Whakatāne.
 Jack Roderick – of Gisborne.
 Valerie Jessie Scott  – of Wellington.
 Phyllis Maud Topp – of South Auckland.
 Mary Page Walker – of Ōpōtiki.
 Eric Ngametua Wichman-Ngau – of Auckland.
 Barbara Makare Williams – of Auckland.
 Te Hira Paraone (Brownie) Williams – of Auckland.
 Richard Yates – of Christchurch.

For public services
 Cicely Jean Bibby – of Mount Maunganui.
 Douglas Brew – of Palmerston North; detective inspector, New Zealand Police.
 Samuel Mita Carter – of Featherston.
 Hazel Doris Chapman – of Hamilton.
 Bruce Chilton – of Invercargill.
 Reginald Gerald Dawkins – of Picton.
 Owen William Lee Dine – of Napier.
 Joyce Emma Douglas – of Levin.
 Ralph Oliver Gillespie – of Blenheim; lately senior constable, New Zealand Police.
 Dorothy Caroline Grant – of Auckland.
 Lenore Hart – of Bluff.
 Wendy Faye Hawkings – of Warkworth.
 Pamela Elizabeth Heath – of Auckland.
 Lorna Hughes – of London, United Kingdom.
 David Stanley Jecks – of Cambridge.
 Bryan George Jew – of Rotorua.
 Mohammad Tauqir Khan  – of Auckland.
 Carolyn Olive McLellan – of Nelson.
 John Malcolm – of Auckland; lately station officer, Birkenhead Volunteer Fire Brigade, New Zealand Fire Service.
 Gary Frederick Nation – of Pahiatua; chief fire officer, Pahiatua Volunteer Fire Brigade, New Zealand Fire Service.
 Frank Anthony Neate  – of Nelson.
 David Bryan John Painter  – of Upper Hutt; lately senior sergeant, New Zealand Police.
 Ihipera Palmer – of Rotorua.
 Rex Douglas Patrick – of Hamilton; chief fire officer, Waikato Area Operations Centre, New Zealand Fire Service.
 The Reverend Robert Logan Peck – of Raetihi.
 Gustave Marie Willem Frans Porteners – of Porirua.
 Robert Eric Sincock – of Kaiapoi.
 Sharon Lee Stewart – of Auckland.
 Brian Russell Tegg – of Piopio.
 Peter Murray Thompson – of Wellington; lately senior sergeant, New Zealand Police.
 Thomas Thompson  – of Kaponga.
 Beverley Joy Tonks – of Wellington.
 Margaret Trotter – of Invercargill.
 Leonardine Veronica Van Der Sluis  – of Orewa.
 William Joseph Walker – of Christchurch.
 Henry William Kennedy Watson – of Tuakau.

References

New Year Honours
1998 awards
1998 in New Zealand
New Zealand awards